Rick Reynolds (born December 13, 1951) is an American comedian known for his one-man shows Only the Truth Is Funny and All Grown Up...and No Place to Go. Only the Truth Is Funny began as a theatrical show and was eventually broadcast on Showtime and nominated for a 1993 Emmy Award for writing.

Early life and education
Reynolds was born in Wood Village, Oregon, a suburb of in Portland. His father drowned when Rick was six months old. His manic depressive mother brought in several stepfathers, who were abusive. He graduated from Portland State University in 1976 with a Bachelor of Science in philosophy.

Career
In 1997, Reynolds starred in the short-lived sitcom Life... and Stuff, which he also co-created. Prior to the release of Life... and Stuff Reynolds was quoted at a press conference saying, "If this is canceled, and my whole career has worked toward this point . . .," Reynolds said, letting the thought hang. "Who am I kidding? Is it going to happen again? I'm not a great-looking guy and I'm 45 now. This is it. So, of course, I'll be devastated."

Personal life 
Reynolds married his first wife attending college. He met his second wife, Lisa, in San Francisco, and married her in 1983. In 1989, Reynolds moved with his family from Hollywood to Petaluma, California, about which Reynolds said "none of my neighbors have written a screenplay." Their first son, Cooper, was born in 1988 or 1989. They divorced in 2000.

Comedic shows
 "Only the Truth Is Funny" (1991)
 "All Grown Up ... And No Place to Go" (1995)
 "Love, God, Sex (and Other Stuff I Don't Have)" (2009)
 "Only the Truth Is Funny: Mid-Life at the Oasis" (2009)

References

External links 

Only the Truth Is Funny at YouTube
Rick Reynolds Facebook Fan Page

Rick Reynolds' Only the Truth Is Funny by producer Robert B. Weide
Hollywood Story in Which Truth Plays by Robert Epstein, Los Angeles Times
Reynolds Escapes New York by Steven Winn, San Francisco Chronicle

1951 births
Living people
American television writers
American male television writers
Portland State University alumni
People from Multnomah County, Oregon
People from the San Francisco Bay Area
American comedy writers
American male novelists
American male television actors
American male dramatists and playwrights
20th-century American male actors
21st-century American male actors
21st-century American non-fiction writers
American memoirists
20th-century American dramatists and playwrights
20th-century American male writers
20th-century American non-fiction writers
American male non-fiction writers
Screenwriters from Oregon
20th-century American comedians
21st-century American comedians
21st-century American male writers